The Chinese Women's Super League (CWSL) is the top level women's football league in China. It was called the Chinese Women's National Football League from 2011 to 2014.

History
The league started in 1997 as the Chinese Women's Premier Football League. The name Women's Super League was first adopted in 2004. During the 2011 to 2014 seasons, the league was renamed to Women's National Football League and discontinued the practice of promotion and relegation due to a lack of available teams and playing talent.

In 2015, the Chinese Football Association relaunched the league, again as the Women's Super League and with an affiliated second division, CWFL. It also gained a title sponsor, LeTV Holdings Co Ltd. The league signed a five-year deal with Spanish apparel company Kelme to provide uniforms.

Investment in women's clubs accelerated after the 2016 season with major corporate sponsors and investors, such as Quanjian Group and Guotai Junan Securities, raising player salaries and recruiting high-profile players from top-division leagues in Europe. This included Brazilian star Cristiane from Paris Saint-Germain to Changchun Zhuoyue, 2016 Toppserien golden boot winner Isabell Herlovsen from LSK Kvinner FK to Jiangsu Suning F.C., and Nigerian star Asisat Oshoala from Arsenal L.F.C. and Cameroonian star Gaelle Enganamouit from FC Rosengård to Dalian Quanjian F.C.

Current clubs

Champions
The list of CWSL champions:

1997: Guangdong Haiyin
1998: Shanghai Yuandong
1999: Beijing Chengjian
2000: Shanghai STV Youlizi
2001: Shanghai STV
2002: Beijing Chengjian
2003: Shanghai STV
2004: Shanghai STV
2005: Shanghai STV
2006: Shanghai STV
2007: Tianjin Huisen
2008: Dalian Shide
2009: Jiangsu Huatai
2010: Shanghai STV
2011: Team Shanghai
2012: Dalian Shide
2013: Dalian Aerbin
2014: Team Shanghai
2015: Shanghai Guotai Jun'an
2016: Dalian Quanjian
2017: Dalian Quanjian
2018: Dalian Quanjian
2019: Jiangsu Suning
2020: Wuhan Jianghan University
2021: Wuhan Jianghan University
2022: Wuhan Jianghan University

See also
 Sport in China
 Football in China
 Women's football in China
 China women's national football team

References

External links
 Official website, theCFA.cn 
 League at futbol24.com
 Official Website  of the Federation (in Chinese)
 Past and current league seasons (in Chinese)

 
China
women
1
Summer association football leagues
Women's sports leagues in China
Sports leagues established in 1997
Professional sports leagues in China